Karczmy-Kolonia  is a village in the administrative district of Gmina Zelów, within Bełchatów County, Łódź Voivodeship, in central Poland.

The village has a population of 60.

References

Karczmy-Kolonia